KHGZ 670 AM is a radio station licensed to Glenwood, Arkansas.  The station broadcasts a country music format and is owned by MLS Broadcasting, Inc. KHGZ is also heard on 98.9 FM—including after sunset—through a translator in Glenwood, Arkansas.

Previous logo

References

External links
KGGZ's website

Country radio stations in the United States
HGZ
1980 establishments in Arkansas
Radio stations established in 1980
HGZ